Sogto Ochirov (born September 1993) is a Russian intersex activist, archer and shepherd. He is a buryat from Zabaykalsky Krai. He is known for speaking openly about living with partial androgen insensitivity. He became the subject of a YouTube-documentary by Elena Pogrebizhskaya "Intersex people in Russia"

Biography 
Ochirov was born in Zabaykalsky Krai, Russia. He was assigned female at birth based on the appearance of his genitals and named Tsyregma.

When he was 13 years old, at a school medical examination, doctors sent him for additional examinations when they found out that he did not have a period. So by the age of 16 in Chita, an intersex variation was found in him - partial insensitivity to androgens. And he was sent to the capital of Russia for further medical support. Where he had an operation to remove the external male genital organs and prescribed female hormones.

But due to male gender identity and gender dysphoria, at 23, Sogto decided to change his gender to male and continue to live as a man.

For religious reasons Ochirov decided to consult with the supreme shaman Bair Tsyrendorzhiev in Ulan-Ude about which name to choose. The shaman said Ochirov must be named Sogto.

At the age of 24, he learned about the intersex community in Russia and then began to openly talk about his story in order to help other intersex people and find other intersex people in the Zabaykalsky Krai.

To people with intersex variations, Sogto says: “Accept yourself for who you are. You can't run from it, you can't hide. Just live happily!"

References

External links 

 Sogto Ochirov on Instagram

Intersex rights in Russia
Intersex men
1993 births
21st-century LGBT people
Buryat people
Buryat sportspeople
Russian archers
Intersex sportspeople
Living people
Intersex rights activists